The Risk & Compliance Portal (formerly The Business Anti-Corruption Portal) is a powerhouse for business anti-corruption information offering tools on how to alleviate or reduce risks and costs of corruption when doing business abroad. All the information on the Portal is produced by GAN Integrity Solutions, a Denmark-based IT & Professional Services firm. The Portal was created in 2006 and is aided by the European Commission and a number of European governments.

The BACP is referred to by many government and non-government organisations and co-operations, amongst others, the Organisation for Economic Co-operation and Development, the United Nations, the OECD Business and Industry Advisory Committee (BIAC), and the World Bank. In addition, the BACP is the only externally cited tool for anti-corruption risk assessment in the UK Bribery Act 2010 Quick Start Guide. The BACP is listed in the UN Global Compact Anti-Corruption Tools Inventory as an efficient resource to help companies address and implement the 10th principle: "Businesses should work against corruption in all its forms, including extortion and bribery."

Sponsors

The Business Anti-Corruption Portal is funded by five European governments and the EU Commission. The five governments are:
 Sweden 
 Austria
 Germany
 Norway
 The United Kingdom

Information and Tools available on the BACP

Country profiles

The BACP offers important business analysis of corruption risks and legislative framework in over 100 countries across 6 regions: Europe & Central Asia, South Asia, East Asia & the Pacific, Sub-Saharan Africa, the Middle-East & North Africa, and the Americas. The 33 European country profiles are funded with financial support from the Prevention of and Fight against Crime Programme by the European Commission. Each country profile contains the following information:

 A brief explanation of what is presented in the whole profile, including both positive and negative developments with regards to investment and corruption.
 Corruption Levels: This chapter talks about corruption and risk assessments of 8 sectors: the judicial system, the police, public services, land administration, tax administration, customs administration, public procurement, and natural resources and extractive industry. Each sector covers corruption cases and offers an analysis of general corruption risks relevant for businesses.
 Legislation: This chapter presents information about the anti-corruption legislation and initiatives taken by the respective governments.
 Civil Society: This chapter covers anti-corruption initiatives taken by the non-government organisations, the level of media and civil societal freedom with regards to their fight against corruption, and/or their ability to report corruption.
 Information Network: This chapter aims to provide easy access to contact information of the relevant private anti-corruption organisations and government agencies, as well as a list of the Portal's partner embassies.
 Sources: A list of public available sources used in the production of a country profile.

All the information and sources used for creating the country profiles are publicly available, and the team behind GAN Integrity Solutions updates the country profiles at least once a year. Other tools and information on the Portal are also maintained and updated on regular basis.

Business tools

The Portal offers a number of tools that help companies to effectively manage corruption risk, such as:

 Due Diligence Tools: a list of flowcharts developed for agent screening processes, consultant evaluation processes, joint venture consortiums, contractor procedures and public procurement tools.
 Anti-Corruption Legislation:  Quick and practical overview of anti-corruption legislation and treaties that have global reach.
 Training: Free anti-corruption e-learning course to kick start a compliance program.
 Compliance System Guidance: Guide to implementing an effective anti-corruption compliance system.

References

External links
Business Anti-Corruption Portal 
GAN Integrity Solutions

Anti-corruption measures
Corporate crime
Business ethics organizations
Business software
Governance